The International Powered Access Federation (IPAF) is a not-for-profit member organization in the field of powered access, i.e. part of or associated with the industry of elevating work platforms, which is the general term, or aerial work platforms (AWPs), as they are commonly referred to in North America. The term 'powered access' in the federation's name points out its specialization in personal lifting devices which operate with the help of hydraulics and motors, unlike ladders, which are un-powered, and unlike lifting devices for goods, such as forklifts or cranes.

IPAF's members are organizations, companies and private persons, typically manufacturers, distributors, rental companies, training centres and users in the field of mobile elevating work platforms (MEWPs) and mast climbing work platforms (MCWPs).

One of IPAF's flagship services is the creation and licensing of safety training for Operators, Demonstrators and Instructors, which IPAF offers through a network of registered and audited training centres. Upon successful completion of the courses designed for the various categories of elevating work platforms, the examinees receive their own Powered Access Licence, commonly referred to as a PAL Card.

While IPAF's headquarters are in the UK (in Crooklands, in Cumbria), it also maintains local offices in Spain, Italy, Germany, the Netherlands and Switzerland, and has recently opened affiliates in Chile as well as Singapore, with Brazil to follow. It holds its annual summits across the world, with the 2015 summit being held in the US and the 2016 summit taking place in Madrid. With their large network of local representatives IPAF can ensure that training in all affiliated countries is suited to local legislation and requirements.

References

External links 
 IPAF website: http://www.ipaf.org

International trade associations
Organisations based in Cumbria